Ataollah Zahed (1915 – 1991) also spelled as Ataullah Zahed, was an Iranian actor of theater, television, and film; a film director; film producer; screenplay writer; educator; and a voice-over actor and director.

Biography 
Ataollah Zahed was born in 1915 in Shiraz, Fars province, Qajar Iran. Around age 9 he started his artistic activities by acting in a play.

He attended the University of Tehran, where he received a B.A. degree in literature. Zahed was one of the founders of Hosseiniyeh Ershad, a non-traditional religious institute in Tehran, where he taught theater and cinema courses.

Zahed died of a heart attack on 6 November 1991, and is buried in Ibn Babawayh Cemetery in Ray, Greater Tehran.

Filmography

Screenplay writer 
 1955 – The Incident of Life
 1956 – 
 1957 – 
 1958 – 

Film producer 
 1958 – 

Film director 
 1956 – 
 1957 – 
 1958 – 

Film actor 
 1979 – 
 1985 – 
 1986 – , as character Nooragha
 1987 – , as the marriage officiant
 1987 – , as character Seyyed Mamad
 1987 – 
 1988 – 
 1988 – 
 1989 – 
 1989 – Eye of the Hurricane
 1991 – 

Television series 
He acted in the following television series:

 1983–1985 – 
 1984 – 
 1987 – 
 1987 – Hezardastan, on Channel 1, as character Seyyed Ebrahim Rohani, a rohani

References

External links 
 

1915 births
1991 deaths
People from Shiraz
Iranian male actors
University of Tehran alumni
Shahid Motahari University
Iranian film directors
Iranian voice actors
Iranian screenwriters